Taeniolethrinops furcicauda is a species of cichlid endemic to Lake Malawi where it occurs at depths of from  over sandy substrates.  This species can reach a length of  TL.  It can also be found in the aquarium trade.

References

External links 
 Photograph

furcicauda
Fish of Lake Malawi
Fish of Malawi
Fish described in 1931
Taxa named by Ethelwynn Trewavas
Taxonomy articles created by Polbot